Heddøla is a river in the municipalities Hjartdal and Notodden in Vestfold og Telemark, Norway. It starts from the junction of Hjartdøla and Skogsåa in Sauland, and flows through the valley Heddal ending in the lake Heddalsvatnet.

References

Notodden
Rivers of Vestfold og Telemark